Dorothy Spencer (February 3, 1909 – May 23, 2002), known as Dot Spencer, was an American film editor with 75 feature film credits from a career that spanned more than 50 years. Nominated for the Academy Award for Best Film Editing on four occasions, she is remembered for editing three of director John Ford's best known movies, including Stagecoach (1939) and My Darling Clementine (1946), which film critic Roger Ebert called "Ford's greatest Western".

Career
Spencer was born in Covington, Kentucky in 1909. She entered the film industry at age 15 when she joined Consolidated-Aller Lab in 1924. She moved to Fox, becoming a member of the editorial department. Worked at First National Studios assisting editors including Louis Loeffler and Irene Morra. At Fox, she and Loeffler were part of an editorial team that also included, at one time or another, Barbara McLean, Robert Simpson, William Reynolds and Hugh S. Fowler.

In the 1940s, Spencer edited Alfred Hitchcock's Foreign Correspondent (1940) and Lifeboat (1944); the latter featured a particularly feisty and well-edited Tallulah Bankhead performance. Spencer edited four films with director Ernst Lubitsch, commencing with To Be or Not to Be (1942), and now considered "one of film's great farces", and concluding with Lubitsch's last, posthumous credit That Lady in Ermine (1948). Spencer also edited director Elia Kazan's feature film debut, A Tree Grows in Brooklyn (1945).

Spencer edited the disaster film Earthquake (1974), which was the last of her eight collaborations with director Mark Robson.

Varietys Eileen Kowalski notes that, "Indeed, many of the editorial greats have been women: Dede Allen, Verna Fields, Thelma Schoonmaker, Anne V. Coates and Dorothy Spencer." Spencer was nominated for an Academy Award for Best Film Editing for Earthquake, which was her fourth and final nomination. It followed her nomination for what still reigns as the most expensive movie ever made, Cleopatra (1963). 

Spencer had previously been nominated for Decision Before Dawn (directed by Anatole Litvak, 1951) and, with Otho Lovering, for Stagecoach (directed by John Ford, 1939). Spencer was awarded the American Cinema Editors Career Achievement Award in 1989, and was among the first four editors to receive the Award.

She retired to Encinitas, California. She had disconnected from Hollywood so much that her death, decades later, was not noted in the press of the time.

Partial filmography
This filmography is based on the listing at the Internet Movie Database.

As assistant editor
The Strong Man (1926) assistant editor (directed by Frank Capra)
Long Pants (1927) assistant editor (directed by Frank Capra)
Four Married Men (1929) assistant editor (directed by Marcel Silver)
In Old Arizona (1929) assistant editor (directed by Raoul Walsh)
Married In Hollywood (1929) assistant editor (directed by Marcel Silver)
Nix on Dames (1929) assistant editor (directed by Donald Gallaher)
As Husbands Go (1934) assistant editor (directed by Hamilton MacFadden)
Coming Out Party (1934) assistant editor (directed by John Blystone)
She Was a Lady (1934) assistant editor (directed by Hamilton MacFadden)
The Case Against Mrs. Ames (1936) assistant editor (directed by William Seiter)
The Luckiest Girl in the World (1936) assistant editor (directed by Edward Buzzell)
The Moon's Our Home (1936) assistant editor (directed by William Seiter)

As editor
Stand-In (1937) co-edited with Otho Lovering (directed by Tay Garnett)
Vogues of 1938 (1937) co-edited with Otho Lovering (directed by Irving Cummings)
Blockade (1938) co-edited with Otho Lovering (directed by William Dieterle)
Trade Winds (1938) co-edited with Otho Lovering (directed by Tay Garnett)
Eternally Yours (1939) co-edited with Otho Lovering (directed by Tay Garnett)
Stagecoach (1939) co-edited with Otho Lovering (directed by John Ford) AAN (Nomination Academy Award)
Winter Carnival (1939) co-edited with Otho Lovering (directed by Charles Reisner)
Foreign Correspondent (1940) co-edited with Otho Lovering (directed by Alfred Hitchcock)
The House Across the Bay (1940) co-edited with Otho Lovering (directed by Archie Mayo)
Slightly Honorable (1940) co-edited with Otho Lovering (directed by Tay Garnett)
Sundown (1941) (directed by Henry Hathaway)
The Captain from Köpenick (completed in 1941, released in 1945) (directed by Richard Oswald)
To Be or Not to Be (1942)  (directed by Ernst Lubitsch)
Happy Land (1943) (directed by Irving Pichel)
Heaven Can Wait (1943) (directed by Ernst Lubitsch)
Lifeboat (1943) (directed by Alfred Hitchcock)
Sweet and Low-Down (1944) (directed by Archie Mayo)
A Royal Scandal (1945) (directed by Otto Preminger)
A Tree Grows in Brooklyn (1945) (directed by Elia Kazan)
Cluny Brown (1946)  (directed by Ernst Lubitsch)
Dragonwyck (1946) (directed by Joseph L. Mankiewicz)
My Darling Clementine (1946) (directed by John Ford)
The Ghost and Mrs. Muir (1947) (directed by Joseph L. Mankiewicz)
The Snake Pit (1948) (directed by Anatole Litvak)
That Lady in Ermine (1948) (directed by Ernst Lubitsch)
Down to the Sea in Ships (1949) (directed by Henry Hathaway)
It Happens Every Spring (1949) (directed by Lloyd Bacon) co-edited with Bruce Pierce; Spencer left halfway through cutting to work on another picture, Pierce completed cutting
Three Came Home (1950) (directed by Jean Negulesco)
Under My Skin (1950) (directed by Jean Negulesco)
Decision Before Dawn (1951) (directed by Anatole Litvak) AAN (Nomination Academy Award)
14 Hours (1951) (directed by Henry Hathaway)
Lydia Bailey (1952) (directed by Jean Negulesco)
What Price Glory? (1952) (directed by John Ford)
Man on a Tightrope (1953) (directed by Elia Kazan)
Tonight We Sing (1953) (directed by Mitchell Leisen)
Vicki (1953) (directed by Harry Horner)
Black Widow (1954) (directed by Nunnally Johnson)
Demetrius and the Gladiators (1954) (directed by Delmer Daves) co-edited with Robert Fritsch
Night People (1954) (directed by Nunnally Johnson)
The Left Hand of God (1955) (directed by Edward Dmytryk)
Prince of Players (1955) (directed by Philip Dunne)
The Rains of Ranchipur (1955) (directed by Jean Negulesco)
Soldier of Fortune (1955) (directed by Edward Dmytryk)
The Best Things In Life Are Free (1956) (directed by Michael Curtiz)
The Man in the Gray Flannel Suit (1956) (directed by Nunnally Johnson)
A Hatful of Rain (1957) (directed by Fred Zinnemann)
The Young Lions (1958) (directed by Edward Dmytryk)
The Journey (1959) (directed by Anatole Litvak) edited complete cut; Bert Bates added sound effects and finished in England
A Private Affair (1959) (directed by Raoul Walsh)
From the Terrace (1960) (directed by Mark Robson)
North to Alaska (1960) (directed by Henry Hathaway)
Seven Thieves (1960) (directed by Henry Hathaway)
Wild in the Country (1961) (directed by Philip Dunne)
Cleopatra (1963) (directed by Joseph L. Mankiewicz) AAN (Nomination Academy Award)
Circus World (1964) (directed by Henry Hathaway)
Von Ryan's Express (1965) (directed by Mark Robson)
Lost Command (1966) (directed by Mark Robson)
A Guide for the Married Man (1967) (directed by Gene Kelly)
Valley of the Dolls (1967) (directed by Mark Robson)
Daddy's Gone A-Hunting (1969) (directed by Mark Robson)
Happy Birthday, Wanda June (1971) (directed by Mark Robson)
Limbo a.k.a. Woman In Limbo (1972) (directed by Mark Robson)
Earthquake (1974) (directed by Mark Robson) AAN''' (Nomination Academy Award)The Concorde ... Airport '79'' (1979)

See also
 List of film director and editor collaborations

References

Further reading
 Encyclopedia article that describes several highlights of Spencer's editing career.

1909 births
2002 deaths
American film editors
People from Covington, Kentucky
American women film editors